Zakharovskaya is a rural locality (a village) in Sibirskoye Rural Settlement, Verkhovazhsky District, Vologda Oblast, Russia. The population was 6 as of 2002.

Geography 
The distance to Verkhovazhye is 43.5 km, to Yeliseyevskaya is 12.5 km. Aksenovskaya, Anisimovskaya, Savinskaya, Kozevskaya, Ostashevskaya are the nearest rural localities.

References 

Rural localities in Verkhovazhsky District